The parks and gardens in Bratislava have formed a part of the landscape of the capital of Slovakia since the Middle Ages. Some of the historical gardens of Bratislava had such architectonic value that they were widely known outside of the city and well beyond the borders of the Kingdom of Hungary. Perhaps the best known garden in the city's history was the renaissance Pálffy Garden, with its famous landmark, a centuries-old linden tree encased in a wooden terrace frame, seven floors in height.

Today, Bratislava's most famous park is Sad Janka Kráľa, established in 1774-1776 it is the oldest public park in Central Europe. There are over 20 different caretakers of parks in Bratislava and all of the parks and gardens in the city lack long-term and consistent care. The level of park maintenance is low and the parks often lack functioning pathways, benches and lightning.

Gothic gardens 

There is basically no textual or pictorial evidence about gardens and parks from the Early Middle Ages and before. It wasn't until the High Middle Ages that gardens and parks expanded beyond the smallish utility gardens close to medieval cloisters and started to appear near castles, feudal mansions and rich citizens' townhouses. In Bratislava (known under many different names), the medieval cloisters of Cistercians, Franciscans, Order of Poor Clares and Order of Anthony the Great had small utility gardens and the Franciscans and Poor Clares Order also had so-called paradise gardens.

Bratislava's oldest surviving city plan is the Marquart plan, which was drawn by Michael Marquart Dissin. It dates from 1765, when the city was known as Pressburg or Poszony and its official name is GRUND = RIS Der KoenigL. Freyen Stadt Presburg. Mit beygefúgten Nahmen, aller inn = und Ausserlichen Kirchen, Cloester, Tehoere, Gassen und Häuser, So Anno 1765 Aufgenomen Worden ist. There are few detailed descriptions of the parks and gardens in the city that existed prior to that date. The Marquart plan shows both the houses and parcels of land within Bratislava's mediaeval city walls and all the surrounding properties that were located outside the walls. The plots of land belonging to Bratislava Castle are only shown schematically, showing which parcels are built upon. The Marquart plan is a colorful map hand-drawn on four pieces of paper glued together to form one canvas of 1249 x 84 centimeters. It features numerous items besides the map itself - scale, author's signature, coat of arms of the Kingdom of Hungary, City of Pressburg, Hungarian crown, Explication in Der Stadt - a list of streets and buildings in the inner city, Explication in Denen Vorsted - a list of streets and buildings in the suburbs. All texts inside the map are in German language and Latin language.

There are four originally Gothic gardens inside the walled city depicted in the Marquart plan:

 Franciscan cloister garden - used partially for growing vegetables and herbs, but also for prayer and meditation.
 Ursulines cloister garden - used partially for growing vegetables and herbs, but also for prayer and meditation.
 Prepošt Palace garden on Kapitulská Street - the last relic of a relatively large medieval garden that was part of a Royal residence in the 14th and 15th centuries. It was used by Universitas Istropolitana at the end of the 15th century. A tiny patch of this garden survived until today behind the ground floor of the Prepošt Palace wing.
 unnamed garden surrounded by buildings on Kapitulská Street, Ventúrska Street, Prepoštská Street and Farská Street - the garden belonged to a townhouse that stood at the place of today's De Pauly house or Wittmann house which today, after reconstruction, serves the University Library of Bratislava. In the 21st century the remains of a medieval garden house were discovered inside the garden. The garden survived in its original size until today, and it is known as the Liszt Garden.

Renaissance gardens 

The two greatest Renaissance gardens were the demolished Pálffy Garden and the Lippay Garden, which has partially survived.

Written data relating to the green space between the Castle and the 'Palisades' dates back the 17th century. Situated on the slopes of the hills of the Small Carpathian Mountains, the area featured Carpathian oak and hornbeam forests, fruit gardens, vineyards and renowned flower gardens. The gardens contained so-called 'old horse chestnut' trees, often planted into tree alleys. They also contained native oak and linden trees, which have proved to be long-lived.  The north-west slope of Bratislava Castle's hill contained three important gardens, Pálffy, Prepostská and Jesenák.

Pálffy Garden 

The Pálffy Garden was a 17th-century Renaissance garden belonging to the Pálffy ab Erdöd family that was located on the slopes of Bratislava Foothills north of the walled city of Bratislava and east of the Bratislava Castle. Until the 19th century, it was considered to be unique and it used to be described as the pride of both Bratislava and the whole Kingdom of Hungary.

In the 1630s, Pál Pálffy, a palatine of Hungary, was charged with reconstructing the Bratislava Castle. He decided to build a palace for himself on the castle hill in the area of Podhradie. In around 1640, he bought extensive vineyards on the slopes of the Little Carpathians next to his palace and turned them into garden terraces, reinforced with walls. Some of the remnants of these walls still exist on Zochova Street and Svoradova Street. They are the oldest walls in Bratislava outside of the fortifications of the city and Bratislava Castle's fortification system.

The garden was located between today's Zámocká Street, Škarniclova Street, Palisády Street, Zochova Street and Pilárikova Street. It was a very long but quite narrow terraced garden almost  in area and it was located on a hillside. It consisted mostly of terraces and tree alleys. The garden was first styled as a french garden but it was later turned in an english garden. The spacious garden contained several exotic plants, grottos, statues and fountains. It was divided into several parts. Its most striking attraction was a massive linden tree that was completely surrounded by wooden scaffolding and which allowed Count Pálffy's guests to admire the scent of linden flowers while enjoying the spectacular view. The tree is depicted on a 1735 copperplate by M. Engelbrecht and F. B. Werner. The construction that surrounded the tree was onion-shaped and seven floors high.

In 1801, the garden was opened to the public. It became a popular place for social gatherings but by the end of the 19th century, it became neglected and became frequented only by the city poor. In 1905, historian Tivadar Ortvay describes the Pálffy Garden as a decrepit public garden, with plans for its demolition and division into construction lots.

The garden featured the Pálffy Hall, which served as a riding hall, housed public happenings, cultural events, and briefly also theatrical productions. The Hall was demolished in 1893 and replaced by the State Real School (today the building of Academy of Performing Arts in Bratislava). Soon afterwards, other buildings started to be built within the garden next to it – Jewish schools, a maternity hospital, school for midwives and a children's shelter.

After 1900, the garden was gradually replaced by new schools and campuses. Today, the last remaining remnant of the garden is a large hole near Podjavorinskej Street. The remainders of what was a large gardening enterprise can still be seen in the area.

Prepoštská Garden 

The Prepoštská Garden was a large garden  located between Pálffy Garden and Heindl Garden, at the end of today's Kozia Street. Podjavorinskej Street is located within the garden's boundaries.

It was grown with vineyards and fruit trees but also contained homestead buildings, some ploughed land and a vegetable shop, both leased out. Also, herbs were grown in this garden which were subscribed and delivered to the neighboring Slubek's distillery. After the garden was divided into parcels, a new street was created at its place, named after Pressburg citizen, merchant and banker Teodor Edl - Edlova Street (today Podjavorinskej Street), and it was gradually replaced by houses on Zochova Street and Kozia Street.

Jesenák Garden 

Jesenák Garden was located at the north-east point of Prepoštská Garden and it belonged to baron Jan Jesenák. It was famous for its linden trees.

Lippay Garden 

This garden was acquired between the years 1607 to 1616 by the archbishop of Esztergom František Forgách as the place of the future summer residence of the Hungarian Pimates' (highest ranking church officials in the country at that time).

Archbishop Georg Lippay (who was archbishop from 1642 to 1666) had the garden converted into a renaissance garden of Eden by filling it with exotic plants and trees, fountains that used water taken from the mountain springs, artificial caves and a big water pool where horses used to bathe. The garden's masterpiece was a garden pavilion with walls encased in mosaic and streams of water flowing through a musical instrument similar to an organ. The structure even had streams of water ejected upwards from the roof. This garden's configuration did not last long and already in the 1730s parts of the garden's fountains started to appear in various other fountains in Bratislava. The pavilion did not survive this period either. Lippay also had a new summer residence built on this property sometime during his tenure as archbishop.

Baroque gardens 
The most important Baroque gardens in Bratislava are the Koch Garden, which is inaccessible to the public, the Grassalkovich Garden and the Medical Garden.

Koch Garden 

Koch Garden is a protected area on Partizánska Street in Bratislava, established in the 1930s as part of the Karol Koch Sanatorium complex. It contains a large pool and many items of garden architecture such as benches, staircases, artificial hills, statues and winding walkways. Slovak botanist and dendrologist Jozef Mišák established an extremely varied and exotic garden. His goal was to achieve the garden's green look all around the year. The garden originally included 120 species of trees.

Today, it is an important bird nesting site in the city, because of its virtual lack of human presence.

Current issues 
Since 1993 all formerly municipal green areas are taken care of by the 17 city boroughs.

Currently, the most endangered park in Bratislava is the Park on Belopotockého Street. After 15 years of civic activity to save the park, as of 2012, there is no construction at the place of the park, but the park itself is destroyed.

Future park construction 
On Komenského square (formerly Pállfy square) behind the old building of the Slovak National Theatre, there used to be a small city park. In 1972 the addition to the National Theatre was finished here and the rest of the former park was converted into an asphalt parking lot. During Slovakia's European Union presidency in 2016 the parking lot was assigned for the special needs of the Ministry of Foreign Affairs and after the presidency ended, there were plans to turn the area back into a pocket city park. City of Bratislava planned to construct the park (named Park Komenského) in 2018 but nobody entered the competition to construct it. The park will be constructed in 2019 by the company ERPOS at the cost of 375,260.32 euro.

In April 2011, the Mayor of Karlova Ves Iveta Hanulíková publicly presented a plan to establish a new park in the Karlova Ves district of Bratislava, located in an area called Riviéra next to Karloveská Street between the Shell gas station and the Allianz company building. The park (named Mestský park pri Karloveskej ulici) will be constructed in 2019 by the company MBM-GROUP at the cost of 289,393.45 euro.

List of Bratislava's parks 

The following is a list of parks and gardens in Bratislava:

Parkettes:

Other places considered to be parks: 
(Squares)
 Americké námestie
 Hviezdoslavovo námestie
 Kollárovo námestie
 Námestie Slobody
 Nobelovo námestie
 Šafárikovo námestie
(Riverbanks)
 Park kultúry a oddychu (Staré Mesto)
 Rázusovo nábrežie (Staré Mesto)
 Fajnorovo nábrežie (Staré Mesto)
 Vajanského nábrežie (Staré Mesto)
 Dvořákovo nábrežie (Staré Mesto)
 Nábrežie arm. gen. L. Svobodu (Staré Mesto)
 Tyršovo nábrežie (Petržalka)
 Slovanské nábrežie (Devín)
(Other)
 Bratislava Zoo
 Botanical Garden of the Comenius University
The list does not include the city's cemeteries and children's playgrounds.

Protected landscape areas 
 Little Carpathians Protected Landscape Area
 Devínska Kobyla National Nature Reserve
 Sandberg Nature Reserve
 Dunajské luhy
 Sihoť island

Gallery

See also 

 List of fountains in Bratislava
 History of Bratislava

References 

Parks in Bratislava